Cauld wind pipes is a Scottish term referring to any Scottish bagpipe that is bellows-blown rather than blown with the mouth. Such pipes include:

Border pipes
Pastoral pipes
Scottish smallpipes

Bagpipes
Scottish musical instruments